ROV may refer to:
Real options valuation
Recreational Off highway Vehicle, also known as Side by side or UTV (Utility Task Vehicle)
Realm of Valor, Thai-marketed version of multiplayer online video game Arena of Valor
Remotely Operated Vehicle
Republic of Vietnam was the name for South Vietnam during (1955–75) 
Rostov-on-Don Airport, an airport in southern Russia (former IATA airport code)
Platov International Airport (IATA airport code)

See also 
 Rov, a concept in Judaism